Armentières-sur-Ourcq (literally Armentières on Ourcq) is a commune in the department of Aisne in the Hauts-de-France region of northern France.

Geography
Armentières-sur-Ourcq is located some 30 km south of Soissons and 30 km south-east of Villers-Cotterêts.  The D1 road runs through the south-west corner of the commune however the main access is on the D79 from La Croix-sur-Ourcq in the south-west running to the village then west to Nanteuil-Notre-Dame in the east.  The D80 road also comes from Oulchy-le-Château in the north and continues south to Coincy. The commune is almost entirely farmland except for a belt of forest in the north.

The Ourcq river flows from east to west through the northern part of the commune and forming part of the northern border. The Ru Garnier stream flows from the south of the commune north through the village and continuing north to join the Ourcq river.

Neighbouring communes and villages

Administration

List of Successive Mayors of Armentières-sur-Ourcq

Population

Sites and monuments

The commune has two sites that are registered as historical monuments:
The Chateau of Armentières (12th century). Its postern has been classified as a historical monument since 25 January 1921. It is currently privately owned and is visited every year during European Heritage Days. Since 2004 it has benefited from restoration works supported by the DRAC of Picardy and the General Council of Aisne
The Bernard bridges (17th century) spanning the Ourcq.

Other sites of interest
The Church (13th century) was severely damaged during the First World War and almost entirely rebuilt. It contains two items that are registered as historical objects:
A Bas-relief: Pietà Donatrice and patron (16th century)
A Funeral Monument of the Lords of Armentières (16th century)

Notable people linked to the commune
Louis de Brienne de Conflans d'Armentières (1711-1774), Marshal of France
Charles Louis Gabriel de Conflans d'Armentieres (1772-1849), military officer and French politician of the 18th and 19th centuries

See also
Communes of the Aisne department

References

External links
Report on the Château of Armentières 
Armentières-sur-Ourcq on the old National Geographic Institute website 
40000 Bell Towers website 
Armentières-sur-Ourcq on Géoportail, National Geographic Institute (IGN) website 
Armahueres on the 1750 Cassini Map

Communes of Aisne